Ilario Davide Lamberti (born 7 February 1988) is an Italian footballer.

Biography
Born in Crotone, Calabria, Lamberti started his senior career at Serie D (amateur) team Grottaglie. He moved to Martina in 2007 but signed by Udinese in August, in exchanged with Marco Murriero. After 1 season in Primavera team, he left for another Serie D team Sapri.

Bari
On 5 June 2009, he was presented as a new player of Bari. He joined the team in free transfer, signing a 3-year deal. Lamberti was the third keeper of the team, behind Belgian Jean-François Gillet and former Liverpool player Daniele Padelli. He wore no.12 shirt for the first team but only played in friendlies and in Primavera team as overage player.

On 1 August 2010, he became a new player of Valenzana. He made his professional league debut on 31 October 2010, winning Casale 2–1. He played his first official game for the club on 15 August, replacing Alberto Frigerio who was sent off. The cup match Valenzana lost to Pro Vercelli 0–2. Due to Frigerio's suspension, he also played the next match on 18 August. The last match of the cup's group stage, was also played by Lamberti. After the arrival of Marco Serena in January 2011, he became the third keeper, and youth keeper Andrea Sperandio became the fourth.

Honours
Coppa Italia Serie D: 2009

References

External links
 Profile at Football.it 
 

Italian footballers
F.C. Crotone players
Udinese Calcio players
S.S.C. Bari players
Valenzana Mado players
Association football goalkeepers
People from Crotone
1988 births
Living people
Footballers from Calabria
Sportspeople from the Province of Crotone